Dabo Airport  is a domestic airport located at Dabo, the largest town in Singkep Island, Lingga Regency, Riau Islands province. It serves Dabo and surrounding areas. It has some facilities like other airports. Dabo Airport serves ATR 72, ATR 42, Fokker 50, and others.

Airlines and destinations

Statistics and traffic

Traffic

Statistics

References

Airports in the Riau Islands